Dragi Jelić (born 17 May 1947) is a Serbian rock musician. He is best known as the singer and guitarist for the Serbian rock band YU Grupa, which he formed in 1970 with his older brother Žika. 

During the 1960s, alongside his brother, Jelić was also a member of the beat band Džentlmeni.

Discography

With Džentlmeni

Extended plays
Idi (1968)
Slomljena srca (1969)

Singles
"Ona je moja" (1970)

Compilation albums
Antologija (2006)

With YU Grupa

References

1947 births
Living people
Musicians from Kraljevo
Serbian rock guitarists
Lead guitarists
Serbian rock singers
20th-century Serbian male singers
Yugoslav rock singers
Yugoslav male singers